The fauna of the Andes, a mountain range in South America, is large and diverse. As well as a huge variety of flora, the Andes contain many different animal species.  

With almost 1,000 species, of which roughly 2/3 are endemic to the region, the Andes are the most important region in the world for amphibians. 
The diversity of animals in the Andes is high, with almost 600 species of mammals (13% endemic), more than 1,700 species of birds (about 1/3 endemic), more than 600 species of reptiles (about 45% endemic), and almost 400 species of fish (about 1/3 endemic).

Mammals

The vicuña and guanaco can be found living in the Altiplano, while the closely related domesticated llama and alpaca are widely kept by locals as pack animals and for their meat and wool. Cougars are also found in the region and play an important role in many Andean cultures together with the llama. The nocturnal chinchillas, two threatened members of the rodent order, inhabits the Andes' alpine regions, but are well-known in captivity. Another domestic that originates from the Andean region is the guinea pig. Other wild  mammals found in the relatively open habitats of the high Andes include the huemul deer and foxes in the genus Pseudalopex.

Although very rich in flora and fauna, few large mammals are found in the Andean cloud forests, including the Yungas and parts of the Chocó, exceptions being the threatened mountain tapir, spectacled bear and yellow-tailed woolly monkey.

Birds

The Andean condor, the largest flying land-bird in the Western Hemisphere, occurs throughout much of the Andes but generally in very low densities. Numerous other birds are found in open habitats of the Andes, including certain species of tinamous (notably members of the genus Nothoprocta), Andean goose, torrent duck, giant coot, flamingos, lesser rhea, Andean flicker, diademed sandpiper-plover, miners, sierra-finches and diuca-finches.

A few species of hummingbirds, notably some hillstars, can be seen at altitudes above , but far higher diversities  can be found at lower altitudes, especially in the humid Andean forests ("cloud forests") growing on slopes in Colombia, Ecuador, Peru, Bolivia and far northwestern Argentina. Other birds of humid Andean forests include mountain-toucans, quetzals and the Andean cock-of-the-rock, while mixed species flocks dominated by tanagers and furnariids commonly are seen – in contrast to several vocal but typically cryptic species of wrens, tapaculos and antpittas.

A number of species such as the royal cinclodes and white-browed tit-spinetail  are associated with Polylepis woods, and consequently also threatened.

Aquatic animals

Water birds are diverse, ranging from giant coot, Andean goose and other waterfowl in lakes, torrent duck in fast-flowing rivers, and Andean avocet and flamingos in hypersaline lakes such as Poopó.

Titicaca is the largest Andean lake and Junin is the largest lake fully within Peru. Each host several threatened endemics, including grebes (Titicaca flightless grebe and Junin grebe), giant aquatic frogs (Titicaca water frog and Lake Junin frog) and Orestias fish. Although the foothill and lower mountain rivers and streams are relatively rich in fish, few are found in the highest, which generally are dominated by a few genera of catfish, notably Astroblepus and Trichomycterus. In addition to pollution and habitat loss, smaller aquatic natives in the Andes are often threatened by introduced, non-native trout.

References